Hesperochernes is a genus of pseudoscorpions in the family of Chernetidae.

Distribution 
The species of this genus are found in North America, the Antilles and Japan.

List of species 
According to Pseudoscorpions of the World 1.2:
 Hesperochernes canadensis Hoff, 1945
 Hesperochernes globosus (Ellingsen, 1910)
 Hesperochernes holsingeri Muchmore, 1994
 Hesperochernes inusitatus Hoff, 1946
 Hesperochernes laurae Chamberlin, 1924
 Hesperochernes mimulus Chamberlin, 1952
 Hesperochernes mirabilis (Banks, 1895)
 Hesperochernes molestus Hoff, 1956
 Hesperochernes montanus Chamberlin, 1935
 Hesperochernes occidentalis (Hoff & Bolsterli, 1956)
 Hesperochernes pallipes (Banks, 1893)
 Hesperochernes paludis (Moles, 1914)
 Hesperochernes riograndensis Hoff & Clawson, 1952
 Hesperochernes shinjoensis Sato, 1983
 Hesperochernes tamiae Beier, 1930
 Hesperochernes thomomysi Hoff, 1948
 Hesperochernes tumidus Beier, 1933
 Hesperochernes unicolor (Banks, 1908)
 Hesperochernes utahensis Hoff & Clawson, 1952
 Hesperochernes vespertilionis Beier, 1976

Publications 
 Chamberlin, 1924 : Hesperochernes laurae, a new species of false scorpion from California inhabiting the nest of Vespa. Pan-Pacific Entomologist, vol. 1, .

References

External links 
 
 
 Reference Classification by Harvey in Hallan

 

Chernetidae